Dulce María Piña de Óleo (born September 12, 1966 in San Juan de la Maguana) is a retired female judoka from the Dominican Republic, who won the bronze medal in the women's middleweight division (– 70 kg) at the 1995 Pan American Games and 2003 Pan American Games. She represented her native country at the 1996 Summer Olympics in Atlanta, Georgia and four times she won medal in the Central American and Caribbean Games.

Career
Piña was the first women from the Dominican Republic competing in four different Central American and Caribbean Games, winning a silver medal in 1990, 1993 and 1998 before claiming a gold and a bronze in the 2002 edition. She represented her home country during the  1995 Pan American Games held in Mar del Plata, Argentina being the only Dominican women who won a medal when she earned the bronze in the Middleweight – 66 kg category. She also participated in the 2003 Pan American Games held in Santo Domingo, winning the bronze medal in the – 70 kg category.

She was the first judoka women from the Dominican Republic participating in the Olympics when she competed in the Atlanta 1996 Summer Olympics, ranking in ninth place.

Piña retired after the 2003 Pan American Games and was inducted to the Dominican Republic Sports Hall of Fame in 2012. After that she was the president of the national federation during 2012. and named president of the Women's and sports commission of the Dominican Republic Olympic Committee in 2015.

References

  sports-reference

1966 births
Living people
Dominican Republic female judoka
Judoka at the 1996 Summer Olympics
Judoka at the 1995 Pan American Games
Judoka at the 2003 Pan American Games
Olympic judoka of the Dominican Republic
Pan American Games bronze medalists for the Dominican Republic
Pan American Games medalists in judo
Central American and Caribbean Games gold medalists for the Dominican Republic
Central American and Caribbean Games silver medalists for the Dominican Republic
Central American and Caribbean Games bronze medalists for the Dominican Republic
Competitors at the 1990 Central American and Caribbean Games
Competitors at the 1993 Central American and Caribbean Games
Competitors at the 1998 Central American and Caribbean Games
Competitors at the 2002 Central American and Caribbean Games
Central American and Caribbean Games medalists in judo
Medalists at the 1995 Pan American Games
20th-century Dominican Republic women
21st-century Dominican Republic women